Loppington is a village and parish in Shropshire, England, situated a few miles west of Wem. The population of the parish (2001) is 576 and there are 206 households. The population as of the 2011 census was 611.

Loppington was recorded in the Domesday Book as Lopitone.

It has a rich history and many historical buildings, including the Church of Saint Michael, dating back to the 14th century and having traces of a Norman building with characteristic Norman architecture.

Other interesting buildings are The Nook a timber-framed house near to the church, and Loppington Hall, an early 18th-century brick house, a former residence of John Lloyd Dickin restored in 2002.

The village has the only remaining bull ring in North Shropshire, which was reported to be used for bull baiting until the 19th century.

Notable people
Chris Hawkins - radio presenter, producer, and celebrity
Edward Lhuyd (Lloyd) - 17th century scientist, botanist, geologist, philologist  and friend of Sir Isaac Newton

See also
Listed buildings in Loppington

References

External links

Loppington Parish Council
Shropshire Tourism (archived 2005)
St. Michael's Church - description of the bell tower (archived 2011)

Villages in Shropshire
Civil parishes in Shropshire